Philip Jones (died 1603), of London and Llanarth, Monmouthshire, was a Welsh politician.

He was a Member (MP) of the Parliament of England for Monmouth Boroughs in 1589.

References

16th-century births
1603 deaths
16th-century Welsh politicians
People from Monmouthshire
English MPs 1589